Daniel Alan C Wells (born June 1995) is an English cricketer. He made his first-class debut on 28 March 2017 for Oxford MCCU against Surrey as part of the Marylebone Cricket Club University fixtures.

References

External links
 

1995 births
Living people
English cricketers
Oxford MCCU cricketers
Sportspeople from Eastbourne